Bossiaea celata is a species of flowering plant in the family Fabaceae and is endemic to Western Australia. It is a compact, many-branched shrub with flattened cladodes, leaves reduced to scales, and yellow to pinkish-red pea-like flowers.

Description

Taxonomy and naming
Bossiaea celata was first formally described in 2006 by James Henderson Ross in the journal Muelleria from specimens collected in Boorabbin National Park in 1998. The specific epithet (celata) means "concealed", referring to the difficulty of locating specimens of this species.

Distribution and habitat
This bossiaea grows in deep sand in open mallee in the Coolgardie biogeographic region of Western Australia.

Conservation status
Bossiaea celata is classified as "Priority Three" by the Government of Western Australia Department of Parks and Wildlife meaning that it is poorly known and known from only a few locations but is not under imminent threat.

References

celata
Eudicots of Western Australia
Plants described in 2006